Young Walter Scott is a fictionalized biography of the early life of Walter Scott by Elizabeth Janet Gray, set in Edinburgh in the late eighteenth century. Illustrated by Kate Seredy, it was first published in 1935 and was a Newbery Honor recipient in 1936.

Reception
An early criticism noted that "Young or old, Walter Scott would have had some difficulty in recognizing himself or his environment in this softly tinted artificial light".
Kirkus Reviews described it as "A vigorous picture of boyhood against odds..."

References

1935 children's books
American children's books
Newbery Honor-winning works
Scottish biographies
Biographies about writers
Walter Scott
Viking Press books